James McGee may refer to:
 James McGee (author) (born 1950), English novelist
 James McGee (Irish politician) (died 1956), Irish senator
 James McGee (tennis) (born 1987), Irish Davis Cup team member and professional tour player
 James A. McGee (1879–1904), Canadian football and ice hockey player
 James D. McGee (born 1949), American diplomat
 James H. McGee (1918–2006), American politician and mayor of Dayton, Ohio
 Jimmy McGee, Irish basketball player

See also
James Magee (disambiguation)
James McGhee (disambiguation)